John Skvoretz is an American social scientist, focusing on theoretical methods, group processes and social psychology, and network analysis and modeling, currently at University of South Florida.

References

Year of birth missing (living people)
Living people
Fellows of the American Association for the Advancement of Science
University of South Florida faculty
American social scientists